Jesse Horace Williams (June 22, 1913 – February 27, 1990), nicknamed "Bill", was an American Negro league shortstop for the Kansas City Monarchs and Indianapolis Clowns between 1939 and 1950.

A native of Henderson, Texas, Williams batted .471 for the Monarchs in the 1942 Negro World Series, and was selected to play in the East–West All-Star Game in 1943 and 1945. He served in the US Army during World War II. After his Negro league career, he played for the Tecolotes de Nuevo Laredo in 1951, the Vancouver Capilanos in 1952, and the Beaumont Exporters in 1954.

Williams died in Kansas City, Missouri in 1990 at age 76.

References

External links
 and Seamheads

1913 births
1990 deaths
Indianapolis Clowns players
Kansas City Monarchs players
People from Henderson, Texas
United States Army personnel of World War II
20th-century African-American sportspeople
Baseball infielders